Rebecca M. Meluch, published as R. M. Meluch (born October 24, 1956) is an American writer of science fiction.

From 1979 to 1992, Meluch wrote several novels treating a variety of subjects, followed by a period in which she published rarely. In 2005, she published the first of the Tour of the Merrimack series of military science fiction/space opera novels. The series is set on the warship U.S.S. Merrimack in a future where the United States and a recreated Roman Empire are at war with the alien "Hive".

Works

Wind series
 Wind Dancers (1981)
 Wind Child (1982)

Tour of the Merrimack series
 The Myriad (2005)
 Wolf Star (2006)
 The Sagittarius Command (2007)
 Strength and Honor (2008)
 The Ninth Circle (2011)
 The Twice and Future Caesar (2015)

Other novels
Sovereign (1979)
Jerusalem Fire (1985)
War Birds (1989)
Chicago Red (1990)
The Queen's Squadron (1992)
Eagles of September (2015)
Blood of Akhilles (2017)

Short stories
"Conversation with a Legend" (1989)
"Traitor" (1995)
"Vati", collected in Harry Turtledove's anthology Alternate Generals (1998)
"Twelve Legions of Angels", collected in Harry Turtledove's anthology Alternate Generals II (2002)
"Strength and Honor" (excerpt) (2008)
"Dagger Team Seven" (2013)

Reception
In reviews of the Merrimack series, Jo Walton and Liz Bourke praised the series's colorful and pulpy setting, action-heavy  plot and innovative alternate universe plot twists, but criticized it for exhibiting thin characterization, simplistic politics and sexism.

References

External links 
 

Living people
20th-century American novelists
21st-century American novelists
American science fiction writers
American women novelists
Novelists from Ohio
1956 births
Women science fiction and fantasy writers
20th-century American women writers
21st-century American women writers